Jolowgir (also Romanized as Jolowgīr) is a village in Yurchi-ye Gharbi Rural District, Kuraim District, Nir County, Ardabil Province, Iran. At the 2006 census, its population was 19, in 6 families.

References 

Tageo

Towns and villages in Nir County